In nuclear engineering, a critical mass is the smallest amount of fissile material needed for a sustained nuclear chain reaction. The critical mass of a fissionable material depends upon its nuclear properties (specifically, its nuclear fission cross-section), density, shape, enrichment, purity, temperature, and surroundings. The concept is important in nuclear weapon design.

Explanation of criticality

When a nuclear chain reaction in a mass of fissile material is self-sustaining, the mass is said to be in a critical state in which there is no increase or decrease in power, temperature, or neutron population.

A numerical measure of a critical mass is dependent on the effective neutron multiplication factor , the average number of neutrons released per fission event that go on to cause another fission event rather than being absorbed or leaving the material.  When k = 1, the mass is critical, and the chain reaction is self-sustaining.
  
A subcritical mass is a mass of fissile material that does not have the ability to sustain a fission chain reaction. A population of neutrons introduced to a subcritical assembly will exponentially decrease. In this case, k < 1. A steady rate of spontaneous fissions causes a proportionally steady level of neutron activity. The constant of proportionality increases as  increases.

A supercritical mass is one which, once fission has started, will proceed at an increasing rate. The material may settle into equilibrium (i.e. become critical again) at an elevated temperature/power level or destroy itself. In the case of supercriticality, k > 1.

Due to spontaneous fission a supercritical mass will undergo a chain reaction. For example, a spherical critical mass of pure uranium-235 (235U) with a mass of about  would experience around 15 spontaneous fission events per second. The probability that one such event will cause a chain reaction depends on how much the mass exceeds the critical mass. If there is uranium-238 (238U) present, the rate of spontaneous fission will be much higher. Fission can also be initiated by neutrons produced by cosmic rays.

Changing the point of criticality
The mass where criticality occurs may be changed by modifying certain attributes such as fuel, shape, temperature, density and the installation of a neutron-reflective substance. These attributes have complex interactions and interdependencies. These examples only outline the simplest ideal cases:

Varying the amount of fuel
It is possible for a fuel assembly to be critical at near zero power. If the perfect quantity of fuel were added to a slightly subcritical mass to create an "exactly critical mass", fission would be self-sustaining for only one neutron generation (fuel consumption then makes the assembly subcritical again).

Similarly, if the perfect quantity of fuel were added to a slightly subcritical mass, to create a barely supercritical mass, the temperature of the assembly would increase to an initial maximum (for example: 1 K above the ambient temperature) and then decrease back to the ambient temperature after a period of time, because fuel consumed during fission brings the assembly back to subcriticality once again.

Changing the shape
A mass may be exactly critical without being a perfect homogeneous sphere. More closely refining the shape toward a perfect sphere will make the mass supercritical. Conversely changing the shape to a less perfect sphere will decrease its reactivity and make it subcritical.

Changing the temperature
A mass may be exactly critical at a particular temperature. Fission and absorption cross-sections increase as the relative neutron velocity decreases. As fuel temperature increases, neutrons of a given energy appear faster and thus fission/absorption is less likely. This is not unrelated to Doppler broadening of the 238U resonances but is common to all fuels/absorbers/configurations.  Neglecting the very important resonances, the total neutron cross-section of every material exhibits an inverse relationship with relative neutron velocity. Hot fuel is always less reactive than cold fuel (over/under moderation in LWR is a different topic). Thermal expansion associated with temperature increase also contributes a negative coefficient of reactivity since fuel atoms are moving farther apart. A mass that is exactly critical at room temperature would be sub-critical in an environment anywhere above room temperature due to thermal expansion alone.

Varying the density of the mass
The higher the density, the lower the critical mass. The density of a material at a constant temperature can be changed by varying the pressure or tension or by changing crystal structure (see allotropes of plutonium). An ideal mass will become subcritical if allowed to expand or conversely the same mass will become supercritical if compressed. Changing the temperature may also change the density; however, the effect on critical mass is then complicated by temperature effects (see "Changing the temperature") and by whether the material expands or contracts with increased temperature. Assuming the material expands with temperature (enriched uranium-235 at room temperature for example), at an exactly critical state, it will become subcritical if warmed to lower density or become supercritical if cooled to higher density. Such a material is said to have a negative temperature coefficient of reactivity to indicate that its reactivity decreases when its temperature increases. Using such a material as fuel means fission decreases as the fuel temperature increases.

Use of a neutron reflector
Surrounding a spherical critical mass with a neutron reflector further reduces the mass needed for criticality. A common material for a neutron reflector is beryllium metal. This reduces the number of neutrons which escape the fissile material, resulting in increased reactivity.

Use of a tamper
In a bomb, a dense shell of material surrounding the fissile core will contain, via inertia, the expanding fissioning material, which increases the efficiency. This is known as a tamper. A tamper also tends to act as a neutron reflector.  Because a bomb relies on fast neutrons (not ones moderated by reflection with light elements, as in a reactor), the neutrons reflected by a tamper are slowed by their collisions with the tamper nuclei, and because it takes time for the reflected neutrons to return to the fissile core, they take rather longer to be absorbed by a fissile nucleus.  But they do contribute to the reaction, and can decrease the critical mass by a factor of four.  Also, if the tamper is (e.g. depleted) uranium, it can fission due to the high energy neutrons generated by the primary explosion.  This can greatly increase yield, especially if even more neutrons are generated by fusing hydrogen isotopes, in a so-called boosted configuration.

Critical size

The critical size is the minimum size of a nuclear reactor core or nuclear weapon that can be made for a specific geometrical arrangement and material composition. The critical size must at least include enough fissionable material to reach critical mass. If the size of the reactor core is less than a certain minimum, too many fission neutrons escape through its surface and the chain reaction is not sustained.

Critical mass of a bare sphere

The shape with minimal critical mass and the smallest physical dimensions is a sphere. Bare-sphere critical masses at normal density of some actinides are listed in the following table. Most information on bare sphere masses is considered classified, since it is critical to nuclear weapons design, but some documents have been declassified.

The critical mass for lower-grade uranium depends strongly on the grade: with 20% 235U it is over 400 kg; with 15% 235U, it is well over 600 kg.

The critical mass is inversely proportional to the square of the density. If the density is 1% more and the mass 2% less, then the volume is 3% less and the diameter 1% less. The probability for a neutron per cm travelled to hit a nucleus is proportional to the density. It follows that 1% greater density means that the distance travelled before leaving the system is 1% less. This is something that must be taken into consideration when attempting more precise estimates of critical masses of plutonium isotopes than the approximate values given above, because plutonium metal has a large number of different crystal phases which can have widely varying densities.

Note that not all neutrons contribute to the chain reaction. Some escape and others undergo radiative capture.

Let q denote the probability that a given neutron induces fission in a nucleus. Consider only prompt neutrons, and let ν denote the number of prompt neutrons generated in a nuclear fission. For example, ν ≈ 2.5 for uranium-235. Then, criticality occurs when ν·q = 1. The dependence of this upon geometry, mass, and density appears through the factor q.

Given a total interaction cross section σ (typically measured in barns), the mean free path of a prompt neutron is  where n is the nuclear number density. Most interactions are scattering events, so that a given neutron obeys a random walk until it either escapes from the medium or causes a fission reaction. So long as other loss mechanisms are not significant, then, the radius of a spherical critical mass is rather roughly given by the product of the mean free path  and the square root of one plus the number of scattering events per fission event (call this s), since the net distance travelled in a random walk is proportional to the square root of the number of steps:

Note again, however, that this is only a rough estimate.

In terms of the total mass M, the nuclear mass m, the density ρ, and a fudge factor f which takes into account geometrical and other effects, criticality corresponds to

which clearly recovers the aforementioned result that critical mass depends inversely on the square of the density.

Alternatively, one may restate this more succinctly in terms of the areal density of mass, Σ:

where the factor f has been rewritten as f''' to account for the fact that the two values may differ depending upon geometrical effects and how one defines Σ. For example, for a bare solid sphere of 239Pu criticality is at 320 kg/m2, regardless of density, and for 235U at 550 kg/m2. 
In any case, criticality then depends upon a typical neutron "seeing" an amount of nuclei around it such that the areal density of nuclei exceeds a certain threshold.

This is applied in implosion-type nuclear weapons where a spherical mass of fissile material that is substantially less than a critical mass is made supercritical by very rapidly increasing ρ (and thus Σ as well) (see below). Indeed, sophisticated nuclear weapons programs can make a functional device from less material than more primitive weapons programs require.

Aside from the math, there is a simple physical analog that helps explain this result. Consider diesel fumes belched from an exhaust pipe. Initially the fumes appear black, then gradually you are able to see through them without any trouble. This is not because the total scattering cross section of all the soot particles has changed, but because the soot has dispersed. If we consider a transparent cube of length L on a side, filled with soot, then the optical depth of this medium is inversely proportional to the square of L, and therefore proportional to the areal density of soot particles: we can make it easier to see through the imaginary cube just by making the cube larger.

Several uncertainties contribute to the determination of a precise value for critical masses, including (1) detailed knowledge of fission cross sections, (2) calculation of geometric effects. This latter problem provided significant motivation for the development of the Monte Carlo method in computational physics by Nicholas Metropolis and Stanislaw Ulam. In fact, even for a homogeneous solid sphere, the exact calculation is by no means trivial. Finally, note that the calculation can also be performed by assuming a continuum approximation for the neutron transport. This reduces it to a diffusion problem. However, as the typical linear dimensions are not significantly larger than the mean free path, such an approximation is only marginally applicable.

Finally, note that for some idealized geometries, the critical mass might formally be infinite, and other parameters are used to describe criticality. For example, consider an infinite sheet of fissionable material. For any finite thickness, this corresponds to an infinite mass. However, criticality is only achieved once the thickness of this slab exceeds a critical value.

Criticality in nuclear weapon design

Until detonation is desired, a nuclear weapon must be kept subcritical. In the case of a uranium gun-type bomb, this can be achieved by keeping the fuel in a number of separate pieces, each below the critical size either because they are too small or unfavorably shaped. To produce detonation, the pieces of uranium are brought together rapidly. In Little Boy, this was achieved by firing a piece of uranium (a 'doughnut') down a gun barrel onto another piece (a 'spike'). This design is referred to as a gun-type fission weapon''.

A theoretical 100% pure 239Pu weapon could also be constructed as a gun-type weapon, like the Manhattan Project's proposed Thin Man design.  In reality, this is impractical because even "weapons grade" 239Pu is contaminated with a small amount of 240Pu, which has a strong propensity toward spontaneous fission.  Because of this, a reasonably sized gun-type weapon would suffer nuclear reaction (predetonation) before the masses of plutonium would be in a position for a full-fledged explosion to occur.
   
Instead, the plutonium is present as a subcritical sphere (or other shape), which may or may not be hollow. Detonation is produced by exploding a shaped charge surrounding the sphere, increasing the density (and collapsing the cavity, if present) to produce a prompt critical configuration. This is known as an implosion type weapon.

Prompt criticality

The event of fission must release, on the average, more than one free neutron of the desired energy level in order to sustain a chain reaction, and each must find other nuclei and cause them to fission.  Most of the neutrons released from a fission event come immediately from that event, but a fraction of them come later, when the fission products decay, which may be on the average from microseconds to minutes later. This is fortunate for atomic power generation, for without this delay "going critical" would be an immediately catastrophic event, as it is in a nuclear bomb where upwards of 80 generations of chain reaction occur in less than a microsecond, far too fast for a human, or even a machine, to react.  Physicists recognize two points in the gradual increase of neutron flux which are significant: critical, where the chain reaction becomes self-sustaining thanks to the contributions of both kinds of neutron generation, and prompt critical, where the immediate "prompt" neutrons alone will sustain the reaction without need for the decay neutrons.  Nuclear power plants operate between these two points of reactivity, while above the prompt critical point is the domain of nuclear weapons and some nuclear power accidents, such as the Chernobyl disaster.

See also
 Criticality (status)
 Criticality accident
 Nuclear criticality safety
 Geometric and material buckling

References

Mass
Nuclear technology
Radioactivity
Nuclear weapon design
Nuclear fission